The following highways are numbered 337:

Australia

Canada
 Nova Scotia Route 337
Prince Edward Island Route 337
 Quebec Route 337

Japan
 Japan National Route 337

United States
  Arkansas Highway 337
  Connecticut Route 337
  Georgia State Route 337
  Indiana State Road 337
  Louisiana Highway 337
  Louisiana Highway 337-1
  Maryland Route 337
 New York:
  New York State Route 337 (disambiguation)
  County Route 337 (Erie County, New York)
  Puerto Rico Highway 337
 Texas:
  Texas State Highway 337
  Texas State Highway Loop 337
  Ranch to Market Road 337
  Virginia State Route 337
  Virginia State Route 337 Alternate (Portsmouth)
  Wyoming Highway 337